Ballymore Eustace is a small town situated in County Kildare in Ireland, although until 1836 it lay within an exclave (a detached "pocket") of County Dublin. It lies close to the border with County Wicklow.

The town's name, which is frequently shortened to "Ballymore" in everyday usage, derives from the Irish An Baile Mór ("the big town") with the addition – to distinguish it from several other Ballymores in Ireland – of the family name (Fitz)Eustace. A fuller version of the town's official name in Irish is Baile Mór na nIústasach ("big town of the Eustaces").

Prior to the Norman invasion the area was known as Críoch Ua Cormaic.

Location and access
Ballymore Eustace is located at the junction of the R411 and R413 regional roads, on the River Liffey, over which the R411 is carried by a relatively rare seven-arch bridge. It had a population of 872 at the 2011 census. The town is served by Dublin Bus, with route number 65 running four times daily (Monday-Friday), seven times (Saturday) and six times (Sunday). The journey takes approximately 1 hour 30 minutes depending on traffic, and terminates in Dublin city centre at Poolbeg Street.

The town has been connected by public transport to Naas and Sallins railway station since August 2021, when route 884, a Mon-Fri public bus service operated by TFI Local Link Kildare South Dublin, was established. The arrivals at Sallins railway station are scheduled to link in with departures to, and arrivals from, Heuston railway station in Dublin.

History

Ballymore Eustace in the 13th century – at the time simply known as Ballymore – was the site of a castle, which in 1244 was granted an eight-day fair to be held on site by Henry III. The upkeep of the castle was given to Thomas Fitzoliver FitzEustace as constable in 1373, and his family came to be associated with the town, lending it its present name.

Several of Thomas' descendants also held the office of Constable, including his grandson Sir Richard FitzEustace (appointed 1414) and his great-grandson Sir Robert FitzEustace (appointed 1445). No trace of the castle exists today, but the importance of Ballymore then is underlined by the fact that Parliament was held there in 1389.  It was a border town of "the Pale", giving it strategic importance in the area, but also leading to its raiding by local families.

The first reference to a church is in 1192, but the existence of two High Crosses in St. John's Graveyard indicates a pre-Norman church site.

The town and surrounding lands formed for centuries one of three adjacent exclaves - detached portions - of the barony of Uppercross, County Dublin. These lands, originally part of Dublin because they belonged to religious foundations there, were among the last such exclaves in Ireland, being merged into Kildare only in 1836.

The town was the scene of one of the first clashes of the 1798 rebellion when the British garrison were attacked by United Irish rebels on 23 May but managed to defeat the attack in the Battle of Ballymore-Eustace.

In the 19th century, the town's largest source of employment was a cotton mill (owned by the Gallagher family), the ruins of which still stand by the river at a spot known as the "pike hole". This mill employed in the region of 700 people and a row of single-storey houses were built nearby to accommodate a number of their families – this terrace today known as "Weaver's row", running alongside and down the hill from the local Roman Catholic parish church.

Surroundings
Near the town are the Blessington Lakes, or Poulaphouca Reservoir, created artificially in the 1940s by the damming of the river Liffey at Poulaphouca (the "Devil's hole") which was done to generate electricity by the Electricity Supply Board (ESB), and also to create a reservoir for the supply of water for the city of Dublin. The water is treated at a major treatment plant, the Water Treatment Works at Ballymore Eustace run by Dublin City Council.

Activities such as fishing, rowing, sailing, canoeing and windsurfing are regularly seen on Blessington Lakes, whereas waterskiing and fishing takes place on the Golden Falls lake downstream from Poulaphouca Dam. Also nearby is Russborough House, a fine example of Palladian architecture, which houses the Beit art collection, much of which was donated to the state by Sir Alfred Lane Beit, including works by Goya, Vermeer and Rubens.

It has also been a place of interest for the film industry. The 1959 film Shake Hands With the Devil was filmed in and around the town. Some of the battle scenes in Mel Gibson's (1995) film, Braveheart, were filmed around Ballymore Eustace. The 2003 film King Arthur was also mostly shot in the village. This resulted in a 1 km long mock-up of Hadrian's Wall being constructed in a field outside of the village during 2003. This was disassembled and the field was returned to its original state. The Irish short film Six Shooter (2004) also shot scenes at Mountcashel, in Ballymore Eustace.

Amenities
Wolfe Tone Band Hall on the eastern side of the town was built in 2000 and replaced an earlier 1906 building. The hall is named after Irish revolutionary Wolfe Tone and home to the 'Wolfe Tone Brass and Reed Band' established in 1875. In the past the hall was used as a concert hall and cinema, and the present hall is also put to many varied community uses.

Geep
In April 2014, local farmer and publican Paddy Murphy (who was rearing only white-faced Cheviot sheep at the time) noticed that a sheep–goat hybrid, or "geep", had been born on his farm. "I only have white-faced Cheviot sheep" he said, "and when this one came out it was black". Later the same month he was reported as mentioning that he had seen a goat mating with a sheep earlier in the year, but had assumed "nothing would come of it". Mr Murphy confirmed that the newly born geep appeared to be healthy and "thriving" and was even able to run faster than other lambs that were born around the same time.

In most cases, the cross between a sheep and a goat is stillborn, but in this instance the animal had survived. The unnamed offspring, with its "coarse coat of a lamb and the long legs and horns of a goat", was reported to be in good health. The Irish Farmers Journal reported that it was the first time in its history that it had reported the birth of a healthy geep in Ireland. The crossbreed was said to be extremely unusual, and a charity competition was launched to name the newborn animal. The event gained international attention and was reported by Time, ABC News, and BBC News amongst others. As of April 2022 the animal is still alive and healthy.

People
Former or current residents of the town have included:
Maurice Monsignor Browne (1892-1979), parish priest of Ballymore Eustace, County Kildare, and Hollywood, County Wicklow, and author of plays Prelude to Victory (1950), as well as novels In Monavalla (1963), From a Presbytery Window (1971), and The Big Sycamore.
Bobby Coonan (1940-2007), six time Irish National Hunt champion jockey (1967 to 1972)
Sir Richard FitzEustace (c. 1380–1445), Irish statesman who was appointed constable of Ballymore Eustace in 1414.
Adam Jackson (1929-1989), Irish champion greyhound racing trainer and champion trainer of Great Britain who was born in the town.
Thomas Le Ban Kennedy (1813-1900), Dean of Clogher from 1873 to 1899 and served curacies in Aghancon, Ballymore Eustace and Sutton, Cheshire.

See also
 List of towns and villages in Ireland
 Barretstown Castle

External links
 Photos depicting life in the village
 Ballymore Eustace Online
 Kildare Tourist Guide to Ballymore Eustace
 / Ballymore Eustace Heritage Trail 2016

References

 
Towns and villages in County Kildare